The Northern Illinois Huskies women's gymnastics team represents Northern Illinois University (NIU) in DeKalb, Illinois. NIU gymnastics started competing in 1978 and competes in the Mid-American Conference (MAC). NIU gymnastics has sent one individual participant to the NCAA Women's Gymnastics Championships (1998), two teams to the NCAA Regional Championships (1991, 1995), 37 individual participants to the NCAA Regionals, and three individual participants to the AIAW Regionals. The Huskies currently compete at the NIU Convocation Center and are coached by Sam Morreale.

Championships

Conference Championships
 1992 – Midwest Independent Conference (MIC) Championship.
 1993 – Midwest Independent Conference (MIC) Championship.

Individual Conference Champions
NIU gymnastics has had nine individual Conference Champions.

NCAA Regional Championships 
NIU has sent two teams to the NCAA Women's Gymnastics Regional Championships.

Individual participants

NCAA National Championships 
NIU has sent one gymnast to the NCAA Women's Gymnastics Championships.

NCAA Regional Championships 
NIU has sent 37 gymnasts to the NCAA Women's Gymnastics Regional Championships.

AIAW Regional Championships 
NIU has sent three gymnasts to the AIAW Gymnastics Midwest Regional Championships.

Honors

Academic All-Americans
NIU gymnastics has had two gymnasts named to CoSIDA Academic All-America teams, including one First-Team Academic All-American selection.

NIU gymnastics has had 18 gymnasts named to National Association of Collegiate Gymnastics Coaches (NACGC) Scholar All-American teams.

Gymnasts of the Year
NIU gymnastics has had two gymnasts named Gymnast of the Year by the conference.

Specialists of the Year
NIU gymnastics has had four gymnasts named Specialist of the Year by the conference.

Coach of the Year
NIU gymnastics has had one head coach named Coach of the Year by the conference.

Coaching staff
NIU gymnastics head coach Sam Morreale is NIU gymnastics' first ever MAC Coach of the Year, earning the award in 2017.

Sam Morreale – Head Coach
Dawnita Teague – Assistant Coach
Chris Weiss – Assistant Coach
Lisa Morreale – Assistant Coach

See also
Mid-American Conference Gymnastics Championships

References

External links 
 

Northern Illinois University
Gymnastics in Illinois